The 2nd British Academy Film Awards, known retroactively as the British Academy Film Awards, were given by the British Academy of Film and Television Arts (BAFTA) (known then as the British Film Academy) on 29 May 1949, and honoured the best films of 1948. Three new awards were handed out for Best Documentary, Special awards for film and the United Nations Award for the "best Film embodying one or more of the principles of the United Nations Charter". British films The Fallen Idol and Hamlet received the awards for Best British Film and Best Film from any Source, respectively.

Winners and nominees
British films The Fallen Idol and Hamlet received the awards for Best British Film and Best Film from any Source, respectively, and were additionally nominated in both categories; Louisiana Story received the award for Best Documentary; Atomic Physics received the Special Award for Film; and the United Nations Award was handed out to Atomic Physics, Hungry Minds and screenplay The Winslow Boy.

Winners are listed first and highlighted in boldface; the nominees are listed below alphabetically and not in boldface.

United Nations Award
Awarded for the best Film embodying one or more of the principles of the United Nations Charter.

 Atomic Physics
 Hungry Minds
 The Winslow Boy

See also
 6th Golden Globe Awards
 22nd Academy Awards

References

External links
The British Academy of Film and Television Arts Official website

Film002
British Academy
British Academy Film Awards
British Academy Film Awards
British Academy Film Awards